Várzea Paulista is a municipality in the state of São Paulo in Brazil. The population is 123,071 (2020 est.) in an area of 35.1 km². The elevation is 745 m. It is part of the agglomeration of Jundiaí.

References

Municipalities in São Paulo (state)